The Sue McBeth Cabin on U.S. Route 12 in Idaho County, Idaho was listed on the National Register of Historic Places in 1976.

It is a one-story  frame building built in 1880, with a gabled roof.   It has three rooms.  Its exterior is board and batten and there is an exterior chimney.

It was built for Sue McBeth and was used by her during 1880-1885 as her home and as a schoolhouse in which she taught Nez Perce people to become leaders of their church, in the absence of missionaries.

References

Houses on the National Register of Historic Places in Idaho
Houses completed in 1880
National Register of Historic Places in Idaho County, Idaho
Schoolhouses in the United States
School buildings on the National Register of Historic Places in Idaho